Manzanilla is a fortified wine similar to fino sherry made in the port of Sanlúcar de Barrameda, in the province of Cádiz, Andalusia (Spain), and is produced under the Spanish Denominación de Origen Protegida (DOP) of Manzanilla-Sanlúcar de Barrameda DOP. In Spanish, chamomile infusion is called "manzanilla", and thus this wine gets the name because the wine's aroma is said to be reminiscent of such infusion.

Manzanilla is manufactured using the same methods as a fino sherry and results in a very pale, dry wine. It is often described as having a savoury and salty flavour, believed to develop from the chalky soil near the sea estuary of the Guadalquivir river. Sanlúcar de Barrameda's cool temperatures and high humidity contribute to a higher yield of flor yeast than in Jerez or El Puerto de Santa María. The thicker cap of flor better protects the wine from contact with the air, resulting in a fresher, more delicate flavour than a fino from Jerez. It is typically aged for three to five years in a solera, but some types may be aged longer.

Special types of Manzanilla 
 Manzanilla Pasada is a Manzanilla aged longer than usual (approximately seven years), so that its veil of flor begins to fade, though not long enough to become an Amontillado.
 Manzanilla Amontillada is similar to a Manzanilla pasada but in some cases aged as long as 12 years, taking on more of the qualities of an Amontillado.
 Manzanilla Olorosa is a rich form of Manzanilla that takes on the quality of Oloroso through extended aging, sometimes as much as 30 years.
 Jerez Cortado is a Palo Cortado made from Manzanilla.

On 12 April 2012, the rules applicable to the sweet and fortified Denominations of Origen Montilla-Moriles and Jerez-Xérès-Sherry were changed.

The classification by sweetness is:

Authorised grape varieties
The authorised grape varieties are the same as those of Jerez-Xérès-Sherry DOP:

 White: Palimino, Pedro Ximénez, Moscatel de Grano Menudo, and Moscatel de Alejandría

Serving 

Manzanilla is best served chilled at 7–10 °C (45–50 °F). In Spain it is often served with olives, almonds, or other tapas such as Jamón serrano or seafood.

It is also popular in the cocktail Rebujito.

Storing 

Like fino, manzanilla is a delicate form of sherry and should be drunk within a year of bottling. Once opened it will immediately begin to deteriorate and should be drunk in one sitting for the best results. If necessary it can be stored, corked and refrigerated, for up to one week after opening.

References

External links

 Jerez-Xérès-Sherry and Manzanilla DOP official website

Geography of Andalusia
Wine regions of Spain
Spanish wine
Appellations
Wine classification
Sherry